The following lists events that happened during 1995 in Singapore.

Incumbents
President: Ong Teng Cheong
Prime Minister: Goh Chok Tong

Events

February
 26 February – Britain's oldest merchant bank Barings Bank collapses due to Briton Nick Leeson's trading activities, losing $1.4 billion by speculating on the Singapore International Monetary Exchange, primarily using futures contracts. He was arrested on 23 November after fleeing Singapore for 272 days. Subsequently, Nick Leeson pleaded guilty to two charges out of three charges of forgery and eight charges of cheating and was sentenced to 6½ years in prison.

March
 1 March – The Family Court is established to settle family disputes effectively.
 4 March – The Kranji Expressway is officially opened.
 6 March – "Good Morning Singapore (早安您好)" as Singaporean Mandarin first flagship weekday breakfast programmes on TCS Channel 8 began airing live on Monday to Friday from 7:00am SST.
 8 March – Briton John Martin murdered South African Gerard George Lowe in River View Hotel, dismembered his body, and disposed the body parts in the Singapore River. He is found guilty of murder and hanged on 19 April 1996.
 10 March – TCS Channel 8 begin its trials of 24-hour broadcasts on Friday and Saturday nights with movies and infomercials throughout the early hours. It would go on to broadcast 24-hour a day on a daily basis almost 5 months later in the same year.
 17 March – Filipina domestic worker Flor Contemplacion is hanged for 4 May 1991 murder of fellow worker Delia Maga and her four-year-old charge, Nicholas Huang.
 26 March – Walt Disney Television's Satellite Facility is officially opened making it Disney's first international centre. The facility broadcast Disney's programmes to Southeast Asia.

April
 27 April – The ST Teleport is launched for telecommunications and broadcasting purposes.
End April - IKEA Alexandra store, the first new building adjacently opposite Queensway Shopping Centre is officially opened.

May
 2 May – The first C651 trains are put into operation on the North South and East West lines.
 3 May
 MTV Southeast Asia was officially launched on 3 May 1995 as a Singaporean 24-hour English music video pay television channel broadcast from Singapore seen throughout Southeast Asia in territories including Malaysia and Singapore. MTV Southeast Asia officially launching ceremony or grand launching based in Singapore on Wednesday, 3 May 1995 at 00:00:00am SST with an official opening ceremony by Janet Jackson on the same day after MTV Indonesia under Television Corporation of Singapore (TCS) along with E! Entertainment and Hallmark Channel Asia (now Diva) on same day MTV Indonesia on 1 May 1995 officially sign marked international version of the American TV channel MTV which owned the American TV channel of the same name in Times Square, Manhattan, New York City. At the time, MTV Southeast Asia was having an official opening ceremony or grand opening celebration on air from iconic locations; the Padang, Singapore and Changi Airport for MTV Southeast Asia. At the same time, MTV Southeast Asia was launched on the Singapore Version. MTV Southeast Asia was officially opening its production facilities fully in Singapore. At the same time, MTV Southeast Asia, along with its sister channels MTV Indonesia was launched on the Palapa C2 digital satellite.
 E! Entertainment Television and Hallmark Channel Asia (now Diva) was officially launched on 3 May 1995 as Singaporean 24-hour English high-definition entertainment pay television channel under Television Corporation of Singapore (TCS) along with MTV broadcast from Singapore seen throughout Southeast Asia in territories including Malaysia and Singapore. E! Entertainment Television and Hallmark Channel Asia (now Diva) hasd their official launching ceremony or grand launching based in Singapore on Wednesday, 3 May 1995 at 00:00:00am SST with an official opening ceremony by Tyra Banks along with MTV Southeast Asia officially sign marked international version of the American TV channel E! Entertainment which owned the American TV channel of the same name in Hollywood, Los Angeles. At the that time, E! Entertainment Television and Hallmark Channel Asia (now Diva) was officially opening ceremony or grand opening celebrate on air from icon locations; the Padang, Singapore and Changi Airport for E! Entertainment Television and Hallmark Channel Asia (now Diva). At the same time, E! Entertainment Television and Hallmark Channel Asia (now Diva) was launched on the Singapore Version. E! Entertainment Television and Hallmark Channel Asia (now Diva) officially opening ceremony its production facilities fully in Singapore. Popular reality shows included Oprah Winfrey's The Oprah Winfrey Show and Kim Kardashian, Khloé Kardashian and Kourtney Kardashian's Keeping Up with the Kardashians.
 17 May – The Chinese Heritage Centre is officially opened in Nanyang Technological University, showcasing Chinese culture and history.

June
 2 June – National Day Ceremony song "My People My Home" is unveiled and announced to be used for the 1995 National Day Parade. Since then, it was planned for the NDP to held at Padang in every five years.
 12 June – Dongli 88.3FM (present day 883Jia) is launched as a bilingual radio station by SAFRA.
 20 June – CNBC Asia was officially opened by President of Singapore Ong Teng Cheong on 20 June 1995 at 6:00am SST along with sister channel NBC Asia. It was originally based in Singapore under Television Corporation of Singapore (TCS) after Asia Business News along with a Jakarta and Kuala Lumpur bureau and reporters based across the region. Anchors such as Rico Hizon, Bernard Lo, Lorraine Hahn, Sumire Sugimoto, Dalton Tanonaka and Bill Hartley were part of the original CNBC Asia team which includes around 170 Singapore based staff. It adopted similar programmes from its US counterpart, such as The Money Wheel and Business Tonight, but also had a few of its own programmes as well. In addition, from launch the channel broadcast programmes from CNBC Europe during the afternoon and CNBC US overnight.
 23 June – Singapore Cable Vision is officially launched as a cable television provider, providing Singaporeans with more entertainment options. The whole cable system is completed in 1998.
 24 June – The Ren Ci Hospital is officially opened.
 26 June – MTV Southeast Asia's broadcasting centre is officially opened. It have production facilities which broadcast MTV in English, heralding a wave of music television programmes.

July
 July – Parco Bugis Junction is opened to the public.
 1 July –
CityCab starts operations, formed from the merger of three taxi companies, Singapore Airport Bus Service Ltd (SABS), Singapore Bus Service Taxi Pte Ltd (SBS Taxi Pte Ltd) and Singapore Commuter Pte Ltd.
The West Coast Barter Trade Centre closes due to declining use.
 3 July – TCS opened its lunchtime television news bulletin programmes for both TCS Channel 5 and TCS Channel 8.
"News 5 Today" as Singapore English weekday midday and afternoon television news bulletin programmes aired on Monday to Friday from 12:00pm to 12:05pm and 3:00pm to 3:05pm SST. The bulletins lasted 10 minutes each.
"Midday News (午间新闻)" as Singaporean Mandarin weekday midday television news bulletin programmes aired on Monday to Friday at 1:00pm to 1:15pm SST.

August

1 August – The Seletar Satellite Earth Station is officially opened.
6 August – The UOB Plaza is officially opened. It joins OUB Centre (present-day One Raffles Place) as Singapore's tallest buildings at 280 metres, until Guoco Tower's completion in 2016, which is 290 metres.
9 August – Singapore National Day Parade celebrated its thirtieth years of anniversary was slogan and tagline is "My Singapore, My Home" with "30 Years of Nationhood / My Singapore, My Home: A Nation in Harmony" theme, organizer by HQ Armour and held at Padang was presidented by President of the Republic of Singapore Ong Teng Cheong and prime ministered by Prime Minister of Singapore Goh Chok Tong. Singaporeans celebrate the nation's 30th birthday with the live telecast of the Singapore National Day Parade (NDP) 1995 on Wednesday, 9 August 1995 from 5:30pm to 8:30pm SST at Padang, Singapore. Singapore television viewers can enjoy the live telecast parade aired on TCS Channel 5, TCS Channel 8 and TV12 Channel 12. The commentary on TCS Channel 5 and TV12 Channel 12 in English, TCS Channel 8 in Mandarin, TV12 Channel 12 in Malay and TCS Channel 8 in Tamil. Those out and about on Singapore National Day Parade to catch the live screening of the Parade on the outdoor digital screens managed by Television Corporation of Singapore at all Singaporean shopping centres. Radio Corporation of Singapore radio stations simulcast the parade live over One FM 90.5, Capital 95.8FM/95.8FM城市频道, Warna 94.2FM and Oli 96.8FM from 6:15pm to 8:30pm SST in English, Mandarin, Malay and Tamil respectively.
20 August – The Selective En bloc Redevelopment Scheme (SERS) is announced to unlock economic value for residential buildings. On the same day, the Executive Condominium scheme is introduced to meet Singaporeans' aspirations for condominium living, which may be too expensive for some.
22 August – Sites located at Boon Tiong Road and Tiong Bahru Road are selected for the first SERS project. 
25 August – SAFTI Military Institute is officially opened in Jurong West.
30 August – The Singapore International Convention and Exhibition Centre (now Suntec) is officially opened.

September
1 September -
The Land Transport Authority was launched to develop the land transport system in Singapore.
The National Library Board was launched to improve libraries in Singapore.
The prefix '9' is added to all mobile numbers.
A new six-digit postal code system takes effect, replacing the four-digit system used since 1979.
4 September – News Brief in Mandarin (新闻简报) aired its very final and last edition before becoming a full-fledged Mandarin Chinese channel the next day while the Tamil News (Tamil Seithi) also aired its final edition for this channel beforehand before moving to the newly renamed Prime 12 the next day.
5 September –
Prime 12 and Premiere 12 was officially full launched took place after officially split from Channel 12.
Prime 12 is a Malay and Tamil channel showcasing a wide range of programmes such as variety shows, movies, sitcoms, documentaries, lifestyle, television news bulletin, current affairs and children's programmes.
Premiere 12 is an Singapore English channel showcasing the best of culture, the arts, documentaries, classical music, children preschool and sport programmes.
Prime 12 officially began shifting and reorganised its news timeslots for both Tamil and Malay television news bulletin programmes.
"Tamil News (Tamil Seithi)" was officially launched new extended duration times and time slot such as 30 minutes and aired daily from 7:30pm to 8:00pm SST before Berita 12.
"Berita 12" was officially launched new time slot such as aired daily from 8:00pm to 8:30pm SST after Tamil News (Tamil Seithi) because due to at 8:00pm slot was usually reserved for Malaysian language main flagship television news bulletin programmes on RTM TV1 (Berita Perdana) and TV3 (Buletin Utama).
TCS Channel 8 became an full-fledged Mandarin Chinese channel on the same day and became the very first channel in Singapore to officially broadcast 24-hour on a daily basis after having done so on Friday and Saturday nights since 10 March on the same year marked Television Corporation of Singapore celebrated its first anniversary. A number of revamps for that channel also took place to coincide the major revamp of the TV12 channels on the same day.
News in Mandarin was officially renamed from 第八新闻 to become "晚间新闻" and thus becoming the main flagship nightly television news bulletin programmes and aired daily from 10:00pm to 10:30pm SST marked Television Corporation of Singapore celebrated its first anniversary.
The evening news bulletin "Singapore Today (狮城6点半)" made its debut and filled up the void of the Tamil television news bulletin programmes that moved to Prime 12 on the same day aired daily at 6:30pm to 7:00pm SST marked Television Corporation of Singapore celebrated its first anniversary.
Pacific Internet starts operations as Singapore's second ISP, after acquiring TechNet on 19 June.
Cyberway Internet is awarded an ISP licence, making it Singapore's third Internet operator.
 29 September – TCS Channel 5 officially commenced its full 24-hour broadcasts becoming the second channel in Singapore to do so marked Television Corporation of Singapore celebrated its first anniversary.

October
 1 October – The Public Utilities Board is reconstituted, resulting in the setting up of Singapore Power (now SP Group).
 20 October – The National Orchid Garden was opened.

November
 2 November – Parliament passed the Maintenance of Parents Act, a private member's bill introduced by Woon Cheong Ming Walter.
 5 November – The second phase of the Seletar Expressway opened.
 10 November – Tanah Merah Ferry Terminal is officially opened to enhance ferry links.
 25 November – Century Square is officially opened.

December
 7 December – Jurong Point opens its doors.
 29 December – Nanook the polar bear (of Singapore Zoo) dies at the age of 18.

Births
 16 June – Joseph Schooling, swimmer.
 17 June - Chantalle Ng, Mediacorp TV actresses. 
 22 June - Amanda Germaine Lee, MADDSpace Senior Vocal Coach. 
 7 August – Kimberly Chia, actress.
 14 December - Yung Raja, Singaporean Tamil rapper, TV actor.

Population of births: 48,635

Deaths
 12 December – David Marshall, 1st Chief Minister of Singapore (b. 1908).
 16 December – Anthony Then, dance pioneer (b. 1944).
 Ang Chwee Chai, pioneer of photography (b. 1910).

Population of deaths: 15,569

References

 
1990s in Singapore
Singapore
Years in Singapore
Years of the 20th century in Singapore
Singapore